Top Gear France is a French television series about motor vehicles, primarily cars, derived from the British series of the same name. It was broadcast for the first time on 18 March 2015 on the RMC Découverte channel. It is presented by actor Philippe Lellouche, the professional racing driver Bruce Jouanny and electronic music artist and journalist Yann Larret-Menezo (aka "Le Tone").

History 
In March 2014, Jean-Louis Blot, the director of BBC France, announced that his company was working on a French adaptation of the show Top Gear. On 28 August 2014, RMC Découverte announced at its autumn conference the production of a French version, which started broadcasting on 18 March 2015.

Filming began at the end of 2014 and 27 January 2015 on the runways on the Brienne-le-Château airfield, located near Troyes.

Overview 
200 candidates were suggested for the cast, including Christophe Dechavanne, Vincent Cerutti, Stéphane De Groodt, Vincent Perrot, and Stéphane Rotenberg.

On 7 November 2014 the trio of presenters were announced. They are the actor (and former journalist) Philippe Lellouche, professional driver Bruce Jouanny, and electronic music artist and journalist Yann Larret-Menezo, former editor of the magazine Intersection.
Luc Alphand joins the team in 2021 as the fourth member.

Episodes

Series 1

Series 2
This second season of Top Gear France contains 8 episodes and three additional episodes.

Series 3
This third season of Top Gear France contains 8 episodes. The first episode was broadcast on December 21, 2016.

Later series

Broadcast
The first season consisted of 10 episodes, seven of which are completely new and three that include the highlights of that season. Top Gear episodes are broadcast on RMC Découverte on Wednesday evening at 20:45 for the first episode and 22:20 for the second.

The first program broadcast at 20:45 on 18 March 2015 set an audience record for RMC Découverte, with 966,000 viewers and a 3.6% audience share.

Segments

Challenges 
During this sequence, the presenters are given a limited budget to buy a car that meets specific criteria. In the first episode, they receive €1500 to buy the car of their childhood dreams (a Renault Fuego, a BMW 3 Series, and a Talbot Matra Rancho). In the third episode, Le Tone and Bruce Jouanny play football with French and German vehicles in a rematch of the 2014 FIFA World Cup quarterfinal between France and Germany.

References

External links
 

 Top Gear France
French-language television shows
French television series based on British television series
2015 French television series debuts